Pebble Island  is one of the Falkland Islands, situated north of West Falkland. It is possibly named after the peculiarly spherical pebbles found at its western tip.

Description
Its three high points are First Mountain , Middle Mountain  and Marble Mountain , all of which lie in the western part of the island. The eastern part of the island has lakes and wetlands and is of high conservation value. The two halves are joined by an isthmus on which lies Pebble Island Settlement where the inhabitants live. The island has been a sheep farm since 1846; 6,000 Corriedale sheep are farmed, along with 125 head of beef and dairy cattle.

Settlement
Pebble Island Settlement (Spanish/Argentine name: Puerto Calderón)() is the headquarters of the Pebble Island farm, and is located on the island's isthmus. There is a shop (open three days a week), a one classroom school, an airstrip, a hotel and a golf course.

History
The settlement's Spanish name "Puerto Calderón" (meaning "port of the cauldron [or vat]") reflects the area's early history in sealing, and hunting penguins for oil.

The farm was established in 1846 by John Markham Dean (elsewhere, John Henry Dean), an Englishman who bought Pebble and three neighbouring islands for £400. Dean's family concern passed on to Dean Brothers Ltd, but it is currently managed locally by Raymond Evans, the great nephew of Johnny Evans who introduced sheep to the island and slaughtered the first feral cattle.

During the Falklands War, the island was occupied by Argentine forces which created the Estación Aeronaval Calderón (naval air station Calderon), protected by elements of 2nd Naval Infantry Battalion, which was assaulted successfully by the British Special Air Service in the "Raid on Pebble Island". Thirty to one-hundred and fifty Argentine soldiers were based here to protect the airfield.

HMS Coventry was sunk off the coast of Pebble Island. There are memorials on the island to the British destroyer HMS Coventry and to an Argentinian Lear Jet, both destroyed during the conflict.

More recently, Pebble Island Settlement became one of the first in the Falkland Islands to use wind turbines to generate most of its electricity.

In October 2018, it was announced that Pebble Island was up for sale by Claire Harris, descendant of John Markham Dean. The new buyer would need to obtain a licence from the Falklands Government to ensure that the island is kept in line with the rest of the islands.

Important bird area
Pebble Island can be divided into a marshy east, known for its waterfowl and wading birds as well as a hilly west, known for its penguins. The Pebble Island group, including the much smaller White Island and some islets, has been identified by BirdLife International as an Important Bird Area (IBA). Birds for which the site is of conservation significance include Falkland steamer ducks (100 breeding pairs), ruddy-headed geese (175 pairs), gentoo penguins (1700 pairs), southern rockhopper penguins (6800 pairs), macaroni penguins (10 pairs), southern giant petrels (20 pairs), sooty shearwaters (100 pairs), striated caracaras, white-bridled finches, blackish cinclodes and Cobb's wrens. black-necked and Coscoroba swans breed on the main island.

References

Stonehouse, B. (ed). (2002). Encyclopedia of Antarctica and the Southern Oceans

External links

Islands of the Falkland Islands
Important Bird Areas of the Falkland Islands
Seabird colonies
Penguin colonies